Mandra–Bhaun Railway was one of several railway lines in Pakistan, operated and maintained by Pakistan Railways.

History
A railway line between Bhaun and Mandra was originally proposed to freight and ore from the mineral rich area of Chakwal, at the turn of the 20th century. In 1913, the North Western State Railway began constriction began of the line. The 44 kilometer Mandra–Dhudial section was opened on 1 May 1915, the Dhudial–Chakwal section was opened on 1 June 1915 and the Chakwal-Bhaun section was opened on 15 January 1916. In 1993, against the wishes of the locals, the railway line was abandoned and dismantled. It is alleged that the Nawaz Sharif government allowed the dismantling to occur, as some members of the ruling government had intricate ties to the private road transport businesses of the region. In 1997, the Supreme Court took notice of the dismantling and a categorical assurance was given by Pakistan Railways to revive the rail section. In 2007, Pakistan Railways finalized a plan to reconstruct the line and resume rail services. Again, Minister of Railways Khawaja Saad Rafique proposed to revive the still defunct railway line in 2017.

Stations
 Mandra Junction
 Taragarh
 Sukho
 Daultala
 Dhudial
 Chak Naurang
 Chakwal
 Bhaun

See also
 Samasata-Amruka Branch Line
 Karachi–Peshawar Railway Line
 Railway lines in Pakistan

References

Closed railway lines in Pakistan
Railway lines opened in 1915
Railway lines closed in 1993
5 ft 6 in gauge railways in Pakistan
Railway stations on Mandra–Bhaun Railway Line